is a railway station in the city of Mutsu, Aomori Prefecture, Japan, operated by East Japan Railway Company (JR East).

Lines
Kanayasawa Station is served by the Ōminato Line, and is located 47.7 kilometers from the terminus of the line at Noheji Station.

Station layout
The station has one ground-level side platform serving a single bidirectional track. The station has no station building, but only a small rain shelter for passengers on the platform. The station is unattended.

History
Kanayasawa Station was opened on June 10, 1953. With the privatization of the Japanese National Railways on April 1, 1987, it came under the operational control of JR East.

Surrounding area

Mutsu Bay

See also
 List of railway stations in Japan

External links

  

Railway stations in Aomori Prefecture
Ōminato Line
Railway stations in Japan opened in 1953
Mutsu, Aomori